Harry Anders (28 November 1926 – October 1994) was an English professional footballer who scored 30 goals in 225 league appearances in a 14-year career in the Football League with Preston North End, Manchester City, Port Vale, Accrington Stanley, and Workington. He helped Preston North End to the Second Division title in 1950–51 as well as second in the First Division in 1952–53; he also finished second in the Third Division North with Accrington Stanley in 1957–58. His brother was fellow footballer Jimmy Anders.

Career
Anders played for St Helens Town, before joining Preston North End for the 1947–48 season. The "Lambs" were then a First Division club, but suffered relegation in 1948–49. Preston finished sixth in the Second Division in 1949–50 under the stewardship of Will Scott, before winning the division in 1950–51. They then finished seventh in 1951–52, before missing out on the Football League title in 1952–53 after finishing behind champions Arsenal on goal average. Anders scored four goals in 69 league games during his time at Deepdale. He then switched to league rivals Manchester City, who finished 17th in 1953–54, seventh in 1954–55, and fourth in 1955–56 under the stewardship of Les McDowall. Anders scored four goals in 32 top-flight games during his spell at Maine Road. He was signed by Port Vale manager Freddie Steele for "a substantial fee" in July 1956. However, he only made three appearances in the 1956–57 season as the "Valiants" were relegated in last place in the Second Division. He was sold by new manager Norman Low to Accrington Stanley for "a small fee" in June 1957. Walter Galbraith's "'Owd Reds" finished as the Third Division North runners-up in 1957–58, seven points behind champions Scunthorpe & Lindsey United. New boss George Eastham led Stanley to a 19th-place finish in the newly created Third Division in 1958–59, before they were relegated in last place in 1959–60. Anders scored 18 goals in 114 league games in his time at Peel Park. He scored one goal in seven Fourth Division games for Joe Harvey's Workington in a brief stay with the "Reds" at Borough Park in the 1960–61 campaign. He later played for Cheshire County League side Runcorn.

Career statistics
Source:

References

Footballers from St Helens, Merseyside
English footballers
Association football wingers
St Helens Town A.F.C. players
Preston North End F.C. players
Manchester City F.C. players
Port Vale F.C. players
Accrington Stanley F.C. (1891) players
Workington A.F.C. players
Runcorn F.C. Halton players
English Football League players
1994 deaths
1926 births